Madhuca is a genus of plants in the family Sapotaceae first described as a genus in 1791.

Madhuca is native to south, east, and southeast Asia and Papuasia (from India to China to New Guinea).

Species
Plants of the World Online currently lists more than 110 species:

 Madhuca alpina (A.Chev. ex Lecomte) A.Chev.
 Madhuca aristulata (King & Gamble) H.J.Lam
 Madhuca aspera H.J.Lam
 Madhuca barbata T.D.Penn.
 Madhuca bejaudii Aubrév.
 Madhuca betis (Blanco) J.F.Macbr.
 Madhuca boerlageana (Burck) Baehni
 Madhuca borneensis P.Royen
 Madhuca bourdillonii (Gamble) H.J.Lam
 Madhuca brochidodroma T.D.Penn.
 Madhuca burckiana (Koord.) H.J.Lam
 Madhuca butyrospermoides A.Chev.
 Madhuca calcicola P.Royen
 Madhuca chai-ananii Chantar.
 Madhuca cheongiana Yii & P.Chai
 Madhuca chiangmaiensis Chantar.
 Madhuca clavata Jayas.
 Madhuca cochinchinensis (Pierre ex Dubard) H.J.Lam
 Madhuca coriacea (Merr.) Merr.
 Madhuca costulata (Pierre ex Dubard) H.J.Lam
 Madhuca crassipes (Pierre ex Becc.) H.J.Lam
 Madhuca cuneata (Blume) J.F.Macbr.
 Madhuca cuprea (King & Gamble) H.J.Lam
 Madhuca curtisii (King & Gamble) Ridl.
 Madhuca daemonica (Assem) Yii & P.Chai
 Madhuca decipiens J.Sinclair
 Madhuca diplostemon (C.B.Clarke) P.Royen
 Madhuca dongnaiensis (Pierre) Baehni
 Madhuca dubardii H.J.Lam
 Madhuca elliptica (Pierre ex Dubard) H.J.Lam
 Madhuca elmeri Merr. ex H.J.Lam
 Madhuca endertii H.J.Lam
 Madhuca engkikiana Yii & P.Chai
 Madhuca engleri (Merr.) Vink
 Madhuca erythrophylla (King & Gamble) H.J.Lam
 Madhuca esculenta Fletcher
 Madhuca firma (Pierre ex Dubard) H.J.Lam
 Madhuca floribunda (Pierre ex Dubard) H.J.Lam
 Madhuca fulva (Thwaites) J.F.Macbr.
 Madhuca fusca (Engl.) Forman
 Madhuca glabrescens H.J.Lam
 Madhuca hainanensis Chun & F.C.How
 Madhuca heynei H.J.Lam
 Madhuca hirtiflora (Ridl.) H.J.Lam
 Madhuca insignis (Radlk.) H.J.Lam
 Madhuca kingiana (Brace ex King & Gamble) H.J.Lam
 Madhuca klackenbergii Chantar.
 Madhuca kompongsonensis Aubrév.
 Madhuca korthalsii (Pierre ex Burck) H.J.Lam
 Madhuca krabiensis (Aubrév.) Chantar.
 Madhuca kuchingensis Yii & P.Chai
 Madhuca kunstleri (Brace ex King & Gamble) H.J.Lam
 Madhuca lanceolata (Merr.) Merr.
 Madhuca lancifolia (Burck) H.J.Lam
 Madhuca lanuginosa Ridl.
 Madhuca laurifolia (King & Gamble) H.J.Lam
 Madhuca lecomtei (Aubrév.) Chantar.
 Madhuca leucodermis (K.Krause) H.J.Lam
 Madhuca ligulata (H.J.Lam) H.J.Lam
 Madhuca lobbii (C.B.Clarke) H.J.Lam
 Madhuca longifolia (J.Koenig ex L.) J.F.Macbr.
 Madhuca longistyla (King & Gamble) H.J.Lam
 Madhuca macrophylla (Hassk.) H.J.Lam
 Madhuca magnifolia (King ex S.Moore) S.Moore
 Madhuca malaccensis (C.B.Clarke) H.J.Lam
 Madhuca markleeana Yii & P.Chai
 Madhuca microphylla (Hook.) Alston
 Madhuca mindanaensis (Merr.) Merr.
 Madhuca mirandae (Merr.) Merr.
 Madhuca montana P.Royen
 Madhuca monticola (Merr.) Merr.
 Madhuca moonii (Thwaites) H.J.Lam
 Madhuca motleyana (de Vriese) J.F.Macbr.
 Madhuca multiflora (Merr.) J.F.Macbr.
 Madhuca multinervia Yii & P.Chai
 Madhuca neriifolia (Moon) H.J.Lam
 Madhuca oblongifolia (Merr.) Merr.
 Madhuca obovatifolia (Merr.) Merr.
 Madhuca obtusifolia (King & Gamble) P.Royen
 Madhuca ochracea Yii & P.Chai
 Madhuca orientalis (Assem) T.D.Penn.
 Madhuca ovata H.J.Lam
 Madhuca pachyphylla (K.Krause) ined.
 Madhuca palembanica (Miq.) Forman
 Madhuca pallida (Burck) Baehni
 Madhuca pasquieri (Dubard) H.J.Lam
 Madhuca penangiana (King & Gamble) H.J.Lam
 Madhuca penicillata (King & Gamble) H.J.Lam
 Madhuca pierrei (F.N.Williams) H.J.Lam
 Madhuca platyphylla (Merr.) Merr.
 Madhuca primoplagensis Vink
 Madhuca prolixa (Pierre ex Dubard) Yii & P.Chai
 Madhuca pubicalyx Ridl.
 Madhuca punctata H.R.Fletcher
 Madhuca ridleyi H.J.Lam
 Madhuca rufa (King & Gamble) P.Royen
 Madhuca sandakanensis P.Royen
 Madhuca sarawakensis (Pierre ex Dubard) H.J.Lam
 Madhuca selangorica (King & Gamble) J.Sinclair
 Madhuca sepilokensis P.Royen
 Madhuca sericea (Miq.) S.Moore
 Madhuca sessiliflora P.Royen
 Madhuca sessilis (King & Gamble) Baehni
 Madhuca silamensis Yii & P.Chai
 Madhuca smitinandii Chantar.
 Madhuca spectabilis P.Royen
 Madhuca stipulacea H.R.Fletcher
 Madhuca stylosa H.J.Lam
 Madhuca takensis Aubrév.
 Madhuca thorelii (Pierre ex Dubard) H.J.Lam
 Madhuca tomentosa H.J.Lam
 Madhuca tubulosa H.J.Lam
 Madhuca utilis (Ridl.) H.J.Lam
 Madhuca vulcanica (Ridl.) P.Royen
 Madhuca vulpina Vink
 Madhuca woodii P.Royen

References

 
Sapotaceae genera
Taxa named by Johann Friedrich Gmelin
Taxonomy articles created by Polbot